The Cathedral of the Sacred Heart is a Roman Catholic cathedral belonging to the Latin Rite and one of the oldest church buildings in New Delhi, India. Together with St. Columba's School, and the Convent of Jesus and Mary school, it occupies a total area of approximately 14 acres near the south end of Bhai Vir Singh Marg Road in Connaught Place. Christian religious services are held throughout the year.

History
Father Luke, a member of the Franciscan first order, founded by St. Francis of Assisi, took the initiative to build the church, and the Archbishop of Agra in 1929 Rev. Dr. E. Vanni laid the foundation stone in 1929 and construction began in 1930. Sir Anthony de Mello donated the main Altar of the Church, which is made of pure marble. The Archbishop of Agra presented a bell, vestments and altar furniture. The project was financed by the colonial officers of the British Empire.

Architecture

The church building was designed by British architect Henry Medd, and is based on Italian architecture. A facade of white pillars supports the canopy, and on each side of the cathedral's entrance porch, there are circular arcaded turrets rising above the roof. The interior has a towering curved roof, polished stone floors and broad arches.

Behind the marble altar in the apse is a large fresco depicting the Last Supper. To the left in the side chapel is a large crucifix, next to it a statue of the Virgin Mary.

Services and celebration
The cathedral organizes functions on certain days of the year. Holy Mass is celebrated in the morning and evening every day. The major ceremonies held at the Cathedral are Easter and Christmas. The most important of the festivities during Christmas is the Feast of the Holy Family of Nazareth and the Christmas Vigil Service an hour before midnight Christmas Eve. Various cultural and social programs are also organized throughout the year.

Nearby landmarks 
Located next to it is the Gurudwara Bangla Sahib. In front of the cathedral in the roundabout is the General Post Office of the India Post, which was built during British rule, designed by Robert Tor Russell.

References

External links

 Official homepage of Sacred Heart Cathedral, New Delhi

Roman Catholic cathedrals in India
Roman Catholic churches in Delhi
Roman Catholic churches completed in 1935
Cathedrals in New Delhi
20th-century Roman Catholic church buildings in India